Pier A may refer to:

Pier A, Hoboken
City Pier A in Battery Park, New York City